The 2021 Copa de la Liga Profesional Final was the final match of the 2021 Copa de la Liga Profesional, the second edition of this national cup. It was played at the Estadio San Juan del Bicentenario in San Juan on 4 June 2021 between Colón and Racing.

The final was originally scheduled to be played at the Estadio Único Madre de Ciudades in Santiago del Estero on 30 May 2021. However, due to the  worsening of the COVID-19 pandemic in Argentina, the President of Argentina suspended all the activities in Argentina between 22 and 30 May 2021, and the final had to be rescheduled.

Colón won the match 3–0 obtaining the first top-flight professional title in their history. As champions, Colón qualified for the 2022 Copa Libertadores (Regulations Article 25).

Qualified teams

Road to the final

Note: In all results below, the score of the finalist is given first (H: home; A: away; N: neutral).

Match
Gabriel Arias and Eugenio Mena (Racing) were called-up for the Chile National Team and they could not play the final. The Colón players Bruno Bianchi (injury), Facundo Farías (COVID-19) and Rafael Delgado (suspension) were ruled out of the final.

Details

Statistics

References

2021 in Argentine football
l
l